The women's doubles competition of the 2019 World Table Tennis Championships was held from 22 to 28 April 2019. Rachel Stoker and Liu Shiwen were the defending champions but neither of them competed this year.

Sun Yingsha and Wang Manyu won the final by defeating Hina Hayata and Mima Ito 8–11, 3–11, 11–8, 11–,3, 12–10, 11–8.

Seeds

  Hina Hayata /  Mima Ito (final)
  'Sun Yingsha /  Wang Manyu (champions)
  Honoka Hashimoto /  Hitomi Sato (semifinals)  Chen Meng /  Zhu Yuling (semifinals)  Doo Hoi Kem /  Lee Ho Ching (quarterfinals)  Ng Wing Nam /  Soo Wai Yam Minnie (third round)  Barbora Balážová /  Hana Matelová (first round)  Elizabeta Samara /  Bernadette Szőcs (third round)  Jeon Ji-hee /  Lee Zion (third round)  Matilda Ekholm /  Georgina Póta (second round)  Yue Wu /  Lily Zhang (second round)  Cheng Hsien-tzu /  Liu Hsing-yin (quarterfinals)  Dóra Madarász /  Szandra Pergel (third round)  Kristin Lang /  Nina Mittelham (second round)  Cha Hyo-sim /  Kim Nam-hae (quarterfinals)  Yana Noskova /  Sofia Polcanova (second round)  Sarah de Nutte /  Ni Xialian (second round)  Manika Batra /  Archana Girish Kamath (second round)  Natalia Bajor /  Natalia Partyka (second round)  Maria Xiao /  Zhang Mo (second round)  Farah Abdel-Aziz /  Reem El-Eraky (second round)  Chantal Mantz /  Sabine Winter (third round)  Yousra Helmy /  Dina Meshref (third round)  Li Qian /  Li Jie (third round)  Michelle Bromley /  Melissa Tapper (first round)  Lin Ye /  Zhang Wanling (first round)  Chen Szu-yu /  Cheng I-ching (third round)  Orawan Paranang /  Suthasini Sawettabut (second round)  Galia Dvorak /  Zhang Sofia-Xuan (first round)  Adriana Díaz /  Melanie Díaz (second round)  Pauline Chasselin /  Laura Gasnier (second round)  Adina Diaconu /  Daniela Dodean (second round)''

Draw

Finals

Top half

Section 1

Section 2

Bottom half

Section 3

Section 4

References

External links
Draw

Women's doubles